The following is a list of books from the Richard & Judy Book Club, featured on the television chat show. The show was cancelled in 2009, but since 2010 the lists have been continued by the Richard and Judy Book Club, a website run in conjunction with retailer W. H. Smith.

Main list
2004
Monica Ali – Brick Lane
Martina Cole – The Know
William Dalrymple – White Mughals
Zoë Heller – Notes on a Scandal
David Nicholls  – Starter for Ten
Joseph O'Connor – Star of the Sea
Alice Sebold – The Lovely Bones (winner)
Åsne Seierstad – The Bookseller of Kabul
Nigel Slater – Toast: The Story of a Boy's Hunger
Adriana Trigiani – Lucía, Lucía

2005
William Brodrick – The Sixth Lamentation
Paula Byrne – Perdita: The Life of Mary Robinson
Justin Cartwright – The Promise of Happiness
Karen Joy Fowler – The Jane Austen Book Club
Chris Heath – Feel: Robbie Williams
David Mitchell – Cloud Atlas (winner)
Audrey Niffenegger – The Time Traveler's Wife
Jodi Picoult – My Sister's Keeper
Andrew Taylor – The American Boy
Carlos Ruiz Zafón – The Shadow of the Wind

2006
 Julian Barnes – Arthur & George
 Richard Benson – The Farm
 Geraldine Brooks – March
 Michael Connelly – The Lincoln Lawyer
 Martin Davies – The Conjuror's Bird
 Nicole Krauss – The History of Love
 Anchee Min – Empress Orchid
 Kate Mosse – Labyrinth (winner)
 Eva Rice – The Lost Art of Keeping Secrets
 Andrew Smith – Moondust: In Search of the Men Who Fell to Earth

2007
Chimamanda Ngozi Adichie – Half of a Yellow Sun
William Boyd – Restless
A. M. Homes – This Book Will Save Your Life
Lori Lansens – The Girls
James Robertson – The Testament of Gideon Mack
Griff Rhys Jones – Semi-detached
Jed Rubenfeld – The Interpretation of Murder (winner)
Catherine Ryan Hyde – Love in the Present Tense

2008
Danny Scheinmann – Random Acts of Heroic Love
Katharine McMahon – Rose of Sebastopol
Roger Jon Ellory – A Quiet Belief in Angels
Patrick Gale – Notes from an Exhibition
Joshua Ferris – Then We Came to the End
Mark Slouka – Visible World
Lloyd Jones – Mister Pip
Tim Butcher – Blood River
Peter Ho Davies – The Welsh Girl
Khaled Hosseini – A Thousand Splendid Suns (winner)

2009
 Jesse Kellerman – The Brutal Art
 Kate Summerscale – The Suspicions of Mr Whicher
 Andrew Davidson – The Gargoyle
 Kate Atkinson – When Will There Be Good News?
 David Ebershoff – The 19th Wife
 Frances Osborne – The Bolter: Idina Sackville-The Woman Who Scandalised 1920s Society and Became White Mischief's Infamous Seductress
 Joseph O'Neill – Netherland
 Beatrice Colin – The Luminous Life of Lilly Aphrodite
 Elizabeth H. Winthrop – December
 Steven Galloway – The Cellist of Sarajevo

Summer book lists
2004
 Jennifer Donnelly – A Gathering Light
 P. J. Tracy – Want to Play?
 Cecelia Ahern – PS, I Love You
 Maile Meloy – Liars and Saints
 Ben Richards – The Mermaid and the Drunks
 Bella Pollen – Hunting Unicorns

2005
 Karen Quinn – The Ivy Chronicles
 George Hagen – The Laments
 Anthony Capella – The Food of Love
 Susan Fletcher- Eve Green
 Ben Sherwood – The Death and Life of Charlie St. Cloud
 David Wolstencroft – Good News, Bad News

2006
 Jim Lynch – The Highest Tide
 Sam Bourne – The Righteous Men
 Victoria Hislop – The Island
 Dorothy Koomson – My Best Friend's Girl
 Elisabeth Hyde – The Abortionist's Daughter
 Elizabeth Kostova – The Historian

2007
 Kim Edwards – The Memory Keeper's Daughter
 Simon Kernick – Relentless
 Kate Morton – The House at Riverton
 Paul Torday – Salmon Fishing in the Yemen
 Jane Fallon – Getting Rid of Matthew
 Mark Mills – The Savage Garden
 Jonathan Tropper – How to talk to a Widower
 Mary Lawson – The Other Side of the Bridge

2008
 Sadie Jones – The Outcast
 Linwood Barclay – No Time For Goodbye
 Julia Gregson – East of the Sun
 John Hart – Down River
 Margret Cezair – The Pirate's Daughter
 Rebecca Miller – The Private Lives of Pippa Lee
 Toni Jordan – Addition
 James Bradley – The Resurrectionist

2009
 Julian Fellowes – Past Imperfect
 Dave Boling – Guernica
 Stephen L. Carter – Palace Council
 Charles Elton – Mr Toppit
 Jill Dawson – The Great Lover
 Colin Bateman – Mystery Man
 Sue Miller – The Senator's Wife
 Janice Y. K. Lee – The Piano Teacher

Website book lists
2010 – Winter
 Rosamund Lupton – Sister
 Delphine de Vigan – No and Me
 Jo Nesbø – The Snowman
 Naseem Rakha – The Crying Tree
 Thomas Trofimuk – Waiting for Columbus
 Maria McCann – The Wilding
 Rachel Hore – A Place of Secrets
 Ben Macintyre – Operation Mincemeat

2011 – Spring
 Nigel Farndale – The Blasphemer
 Helen Simonson – Major Pettigrew's Last Stand
 Lucinda Riley – Hothouse Flower
 Suzanne Bugler – This Perfect World
 Emma Donoghue – Room
 Gregg Hurwitz – You're Next
 Rose Tremain – Trespass
 Sarah Blake – The Postmistress

2011 – Summer
 Sarah Winman – When God Was a Rabbit
 Suzannah Dunn – The Confessions of Katherine Howard
 Jed Rubenfeld – The Death Instinct
 Natasha Solomons – The Novel in the Viola
 Erin Kelly – The Poison Tree
 Elizabeth Speller – The Return of Captain John Emmett
 Anna Quindlen – Every Last One
 Bella Pollen – The Summer of the Bear

2011 – Autumn 
 Megan Abbott – The End Of Everything
 Aimee Bender – The Particular Sadness of Lemon Cake
 Peter May – The Blackhouse
 Lisa Genova – Left Neglected
 Michelle Paver – Dark Matter
 Carol Birch – Jamrach's Menagerie
 Araminta Hall – Everything and Nothing
 David Hosp – Next of Kin

2012 – Spring
 Amanda Brooke – Yesterday's Sun
 Louisa Young – My Dear i Wanted To Tell You
 Paula McLain – The Paris Wife
 S. J. Watson – Before I Go To Sleep
 Mons Kallentoft – Midwinter Sacrifice
 Jojo Moyes – Me Before You
 Alison Littlewood – A Cold Season
 Rachel Simon – The Story of Beautiful Girl

2012 – Summer
 Victoria Hislop – The Thread
 Erin Morgenstern – The Night Circus
 Louise Douglas – The Secret Between Us
 Laura Harrington – Alice Bliss
 Shelley Harris – Jubilee
 Robert Harris – The Fear Index
 Lars Kepler – The Hypnotist
 Penny Hancock – Tideline
 Emylia Hall – The Book Of Summers
 Patrick Gale – A Perfectly Good Man

2012 – Autumn
 Elizabeth Noble -Between A Mother And Her Child 
 Maria Duenas – The Seamstress 
 Lisa Ballantyne – The Guilty One
 Ben Macintyre – Double Cross
 Eowyn Ivey – The Snow Child
 Hannah Richell – Secrets Of The Tides
 Adriana Trigiani – The Shoemaker's Wife 
 Robert Goddard – Fault Line
 Helen Dunmore – The Greatcoat
 Anthony Horowitz – The House Of Silk

2013 – Spring
 Rachel Joyce -The Unlikely Pilgrimage of Harold Fry 
 David Mark – Dark Winter 
 John Green – The Fault in Our Stars
 Charity Norman – After The Fall
 Gillian Flynn – Gone Girl
 Chris Cleave – Gold
 Julia Gregson – Jasmine Nights 
 Noah Hawley – The Good Father
 Grace McCleen – The Land Of Decoration
 Jennifer McVeigh – The Fever Tree

2013 – Summer
 Karen Walker – The Age Of Miracles 
 Sophie McKenzie – close My Eyes 
 Kathleen MacMahon – This Is How It Ends 
 James Oswald – Natural Causes 
 M.L.Stedman – The Light Between Oceans 
 Joanna Rossiter – The Sea Change 
 Gavin Extence – The Universe Versus Alex Woods  
 Simon Mawer – The Girl Who Fell From The Sky 
 Lucy Clarke – The Sea Sisters 
 Liza Klaussman – Tigers In Red Weather 

2013 – Autumn
 Lauren Beukes – The Shining Girls 
 Maggie O'Farrell – Instructions For A Heatwave 
 Deborah Moggach – Heartbreak Hotel 
 Tim Weaver – Never Coming Back 
 Tracy Chevalier – The Last Runaway 
 Saskia Sarginson – The Twins 
 Liane Moriarty – The Husband's Secret 
 Nele Neuhaus – Snow White Must Die 

2014 – Spring
 Jodi Picoult – The Storyteller
 Louise Doughty – Apple Tree Yard
 Sian Busby – A Commonplace Killing
 Graeme Simsion – The Rosie Project
 Koethi Zan – The Never List
 Curtis Sittenfeld – Sisterland
 Jo Baker – Longbourn
 Becky Masterman – Rage Against Dying

2014 – Summer
 Khaled Hosseini – And the Mountains Echoed
 Terry Hayes – I Am Pilgrim
 Robert Harris – An Officer and a Spy
 Helen Dunmore – The Lie
 M. J. Arlidge – Eeny Meeny
 Julie Cohen – Dear Thing
 Lucie Whitehouse – Before We Met
 Sinead Moriarty – Mad About You

2014 – Autumn
 Jane Shemilt – Daughter
 Claire North – The First Fifteen Lives of Harry August
 Daisy Goodwin – The Fortune Hunter
 Andy Weir – The Martian
 Sarah Hilary – Someone Else's Skin
 Rowan Coleman – The Memory Book
 Antonia Hodgson – The Devil in the Marshalsea
 Rick Stein – Under a Mackerel Sky

2015 – Spring
 Jessie Burton – The Miniaturist
 Claire Kendal – The Book of You
 Emma Healey – Elizabeth is Missing
 Tony Parsons – The Murder Bag
 Anna McPartlin – The Last Days of Rabbit Hayes
 Sheila Hancock – Miss Carter's War
 Charles Cumming – A Colder War
 Naomi Wood – Mrs. Hemingway

2015 – Summer
 David Nicholls – Us
 Joel Dicker – The Truth About The Harry Quebert Affair
 Linwood Barclay – No Safe House
 Fredrik Backman – A Man Called Ove
 Nick Hornby – Funny Girl
 Vanessa Lafaye – Summertime
 Clare Mackintosh – I Let You Go
 Carys Bray – A Song For Issy Bradley

2015 – Autumn
 Kate Mosse – The Taxidermist's Daughter
 Peter Swanson – The Kind Worth Killing
 Anne Tyler – A Spool of Blue Thread
 Dinah Jefferies – The Tea Planter's Wife
 S K Tremayne – The Ice Twins
 Lucie Brownlee – Life After You
 Catherine Chanter – The Well
 Joseph Kanon – Leaving Berlin

2016 – Spring
 Laura Barnett – The Versions of Us
 Rosamund Lupton – The Quality of Silence
 Ruth Ware – In A Dark Dark Wood
 Mason Cross – The Samaritan
 Jenny Eclair – Moving
 Sarah Winman – A Year of Marvellous Ways
 Claire Fuller – Our Endless Numbered Days
 Debbie Howells – The Bones of You

2016 – Summer
 Paula Hawkins – The Girl on the Train
 John Grisham – Rogue Lawyer
 Dawn French – According to Yes
 Stuart Neville – Those We Left Behind
 William Boyd – Sweet Caress
 Lisa Jewell – The Girls
 Jackie Copleton – A Dictionary of Mutual Understanding
 Cathy Rentzenbrink – The Last Act of Love

2016 – Autumn
 Gregg Hurwitz – Orphan X
 Fiona Barton – The Widow
 Susie Steiner – Missing Presumed
 Paula McLain – Circling the Sun
 Sharon Guskin – The Forgetting Time
 Katarina Bivald – The Readers of Broken Wheel Recommend
 Christobel Kent – The Loving Husband
 Anna Hope – The Ballroom

2017 – Spring
 Jessie Burton – The Muse
 Samuel Bjork – I'm Travelling Alone
 Hollie Overton – Baby Doll
 Joanna Cannon – The Trouble with Goats and Sheep
 Bryony Gordon – Mad Girl
 Sabine Durant – Lie with Me
 Keith Stuart – A Boy Made of Blocks
 Liz Nugent – Lying in Wait

2017 – Summer
 Jodi Picoult – Small Great Things
 Shari Lapena – The Couple Next Door
 Maggie O'Farrell – This Must Be The Place
 Clare Mackintosh – I See You
 Robert Harris – Conclave
 Sarah Perry – The Essex Serpent
 Kate Eberlen – Miss You
 Tana French – The Trespasser

2017 - Autumn
 Ali Land - Good Me Bad Me
 Ruth Hogan - The Keeper of Lost Things
 Rachel Rhys - Dangerous Crossing
 Amy Engel - The Roanoke Girls
 Sandrone Dazieri - Kill the Father
 Fiona Neill - The Betrayals
 Victoria Hislop - Cartes Postales from Greece
 Stef Penney - Under a Pole Star

2018 – Spring
 Matt Haig – How to Stop Time
 John Boyne – The Heart's Invisible Furies
 Lisa Jewell – Then She Was Gone
 Jo Nesbø – The Thirst
 Fiona Barton – The Child
 Michelle Richmond – The Marriage Pact
 Cara Hunter – Close to Home
 Beth Underdown – The Witch Finder's  Sister

2018 – Summer
 Elizabeth Day – The Party
 Julie Cohen – Together
 Susie Steiner – Persons Unknown
 Celeste Ng – Little Fires Everywhere
 Dinah Jefferies – The Sapphire Widow
 Harriet Evans – The Wildflowers
 Erin Kelly – He Said She Said
 Lee Child – The Midnight Line

2018 – Late Summer
 Leïla Slimani – Lullaby
 Joanna Cannon – Three Things About Elsie
 Greer Hendricks & Sarah Pekkanen – The Wife Between Us
 Catherine Isaac – You, Me, Everything
 David Baldacci – End Game
 Rachel Hore – Last Letter Home

2018 – Autumn
 Heather Morris – Tattooist of Auschwitz
 Amy Lloyd – The Innocent Wife
 Sarah Vaughan – Anatomy of a Scandal
 Tom Hanks – Uncommon Type: Some Stories
 Rhiannon Navin – Only Child
 Sarah Haywood – The Cactus

2019 – Winter
 Alex Reeve – The House on Half Moon Street
 AJ Pearce – Dear Mrs Bird
 Elizabeth Noble – Love, Iris
 Clare Mackintosh – Let Me Lie
 A. J. Finn – The Woman In The Window
 Sarah J. Harris – The Colour of Bee Larkham's Murder

2019 – Spring
 Kate Mosse – The Burning Chambers
 Linda Green – The Last Thing She Told Me
 Liane Moriarty – Nine Perfect Strangers
 Heidi Perks – Now You See Her
 Christina Dalcher – Vox
 Wendy Mitchell – Somebody I Used to Know

2019 – Summer
 Shari Lapena – An Unwanted Guest
 Michael Connelly – Dark Sacred Night
 Jane Harper – The Lost Man
 Elly Griffiths – The Stranger Diaries
 Catherine Steadman – Something in the Water
 Kat Gordon – An Unsuitable Woman

2019 – Late Summer
 Caitlin Moran – How to be Famous
 TM Logan – The Holiday
 Peter James – Absolute Proof
 Susan Lewis – One Minute Later
 Anstey Harris – The Truths and Triumphs of Grace Atherton
 Tony Kent – Marked For Death

2019 – Autumn
 Stacey Halls – The Familiars
 Oyinkan Braithwaite – My Sister, the Serial Killer
 Anthony Horowitz – The Sentence is Death
 Lucinda Riley – The Butterfly Room
 C.L.Taylor – Sleep
 Samantha Downing – My Lovely Wife

2020 – Winter
 Lisa Jewell – The Family Upstairs
 Alex Michaelides – The Silent Patient
 Alex North – The Whisper Man
 Harriet Tyce – Blood Orange
 Delia Owens – Where the Crawdads Sing
 Gytha Lodge – She Lies in Wait

2020 – Spring
 Mike Gayle – Half a World Away
 Christy Lefteri – The Beekeeper of Aleppo
 Tim Weaver – No One Home
 Sadie Jones – The Snakes
 Philippa Gregory – Tidelands
 Gilly Macmillan – The Nanny

2020 – Summer
 Robert Harris – The Second Sleep
 Jane Fallon – Queen Bee
 Erin Kelly – We Know You Know
 Dawn O'Porter – So Lucky 
 Nicci French – The Lying Room
 Anna Hope – Expectation

2020 – Autumn
 Kate Riordan – The Heatwave
 Harlan Coben – The Boy From the Woods
 Jessie Burton – The Confession
 Jake Jones – Can You Hear Me
 Steve Cavanagh – Fifty Fifty
 Lara Prior – Rough Magic

2020 - October
 Hazel Prior - Away with the Penguins
 Sharon Bolton - Split
 Tayari Jones - Silver Sparrow
 Joseph O'Connor - Shadowplay
 Joanna Trollope - Mum and Dad
 Kathy Reichs - A Conspiracy of Bones

2020 – Winter
 Adele Parks - Just My Luck
 Sophie Hannah - Haven't They Grown 
 Sam Lloyd - The Memory Wood
 Louise Candlish - The Other Passenger
 Peter Swanson - Rules for Perfect Murders
 Eve Chase - The Glass House

2021 – Spring
 Jeanine Cummins - American Dirt
 JP Delaney - Playing Nice
 Matt Haig - The Midnight Library
 Graham Moore - The Holdout
 Holly Miller - The Sight of You
 Stephanie Wrobel - The Recovery of Rose Gold

2021 - April
 Dawn French - Because of You
 Jo Nesbø - Kingdom
 Anthony Horowitz - Moonflower Murders
 Matson Taylor - The Miseducation of Evie Epworth
 Cara Hunter - The Whole Truth
 Emma Donoghue - The Pull of the Stars

2021 - Summer
 Robert Harris - V2
 Gillian McAllister - That Night
 Robinne Lee - The Idea of You
 Ellery Lloyd - People Like Her
 Michael Robotham - When She Was Good
 Kiran Millwood Hargrave - The Mercies

2021 - Autumn
 Rachel Hore - A Beautiful Spy
 Bernice McFaddon - Sugar
 C.J. Tudor - The Burning Girls
 Simon Scarrow - Blackout
 Jane Harper - The Survivors
 Catriona Ward - The Last House on Needless Street

Winter 2021
 Lisa Jewell - The Night She Disappeared
 Karin Slaughter - False Witness
 Marianne Cronin - The One Hundred Years of Lenni and Margot
 Janet Skeslien Charles - The Paris Library
 Laura Dave - The Last Thing He Told Me
 Tana French - The Searcher

Spring 2022
 Susan Lewis - I Have Something to Tell You
 Kristin Hannah - The Four Winds
 Jane Casey - The Killing Kind
 Ashley Audrain - Push
 Julietta Henderson - The Funny Thing About Norman Foreman
 L.V. Matthews - The Twins

April 2022
 Taylor Jenkins Reid - Malibu Rising
 Shari Lapena - Not a Happy Family
 Harriet Evans - The Beloved Girls
 Miranda Cowley Heller - The Paper Palace
 Lizzy Barber - Out of Her Depth
 Kate Ruby - Tell Me Your Lies

Summer 2022
 Liane Moriarty - Apples Never Fall
 Paula Hawkins - A Slow Fire Burning
 Ken Follett - Never
 Lucy Clarke - One of the Girls
 Rose Tremain - Lily
 Lexie Elliott - How to Kill Your Best Friend

2020 Richard & Judy: Keep Reading & Carry On
Richard & Judy returned to Channel 4 during the UK’s first COVID-19 lockdown in response to the rise in book sales. Over 5 consecutive evenings, starting on 4th May 2020 they fronted the series Richard & Judy: Keep Reading and Carry On. Guests included authors, celebrity guests & viewer’s children (in the Kid’s Review section) to discuss new releases & favourite reads.

Episode 01 
 Book Review: Grown Ups by Marian Keyes 
 Kids Review: You Wait Until I’m Older Than You by Michael Rosen
 Guest Author: Dear NHS: 100 Stories to Say Thank You by Adam Kay
 Top Three (celebrity book recommendations - Ant Middleton) 
 Of Mice & Men by John Steinbeck
 The Art of Resilience by Ross Edgley
 The Chimp Paradox by Prof. Steve Peters
Other books mentioned during this episode include: The Stand by Stephen King, This Is Going To Hurt by Adam Kay and The Fear Bubble: Harness Fear and Live Without Limits by Ant Middleton.

Episode 02 
 Book Review: Me by Elton John
 Kids Review: The Lion Who Wanted to Love by Giles Andreae
 Guest Author: Home Stretch by Graham Norton
 Top Three (celebrity book recommendations - Leigh-Anne Pinnock)
 13 Things Mentally Strong People Don’t Do by Amy Morin
 Why I'm No Longer Talking To White People About Race by Reni Eddo-Lodge
 The Skin I'm In by Sharon G. Flake
Other books mentioned during this episode include: Behind The Mask by Tyson Fury, The Lady In Waiting: My Extraordinary Life in the Shadow of the Crown by Lady Anne Glenconner, War Doctor: Surgery on the Frontline by David Nott, So Me by Graham Norton, The Life and Loves of a He Devil by Graham Norton, Apeirogon by Colum McCann, The Other Side of the Bridge by Mary Lawson and Billy by Albert French.

Episode 03
 Book Review: Normal People by Sally Rooney
 Kids Review: Diary of a Wimpy Kid by Jeff Kinney
 Guest Author: Gotta Get Theroux This by Louis Theroux 
 Top Three (celebrity book recommendations - Vogue Williams)
 Yoga Babies by Fearne Cotton
 Each Peach, Pear, Plum by Janet and Allan Ahlberg 
 Gringer The Whinger by Jane Landy
 The Baby Sleep Solution by Lucy Wolfe
 The Cows by Dawn O’Porter 
Other books mentioned during this episode include: The Flatshare by Beth O'Leary, Daisy Jones & The Six by Taylor Jenkins Reid, Deep South by Paul Theroux, We Have Always Lived in the Castle by Shirley Jackson. 

Episode 04
 Book Review: Blue Moon (Jack Reacher #24) by Lee Child 
 Kids Review: Charlie Changes into a Chicken by Sarah Horne
 Guest Author: Slime by David Walliams 
 Top Three (celebrity book recommendations - Bernardine Evaristo)
 Black Rain Falling by Jacob Ross
 The Mermaid of Black Conch by Monique Roffey
 Rainbow Milk by Paul Mendez
Other books mentioned during this episode include: Buried by Lynda La Plante, The Inn by James Pattinson, The Chain by Adrian McKinty, The Boy In The Dress by David Walliams, Gangsta Granny by David Walliams, The Witches by Roald Dahl and Girl, Woman, Other by Bernardine Evaristo.

Episode 05 
 Book Review: Rebecca by Daphne du Maurier
 Kids Review: Fantasticly Great Women Who Changed The World by Kate Pankhurst
 Guest Author: Hamnet by Maggie O'Farrell
 Top Three (celebrity book recommendations - Gyles Brandreth)
 Oxford English Dictionary 
 Oxford Dictionary of Humorous Quotations by Gyles Brandreth
 Dancing By The Light of The Moon: Over 250 poems to read, relish and recite by Gyles Brandreth
Other books mentioned during this episode include: The Testaments by Margaret Atwood, Bossypants by Tina Fey, I Made a Mistake by Jane Corry, The Ordinary Princess by M. M. Kaye and I Am, I Am, I Am: Seventeen Brushes With Death by Maggie O'Farrell.

2007 Children's Book Club
In 2007, Richard and Judy hosted a special Children's Book Club edition of the show as part of Channel 4's "Lost For Words" season. The featured books were chosen with the help of pupils from several schools around the UK.

5+ / Early
 Claire Freedman & Ben Cort – Aliens Love Underpants
 Sally Grindley & Lindsey Gardiner – Poppy and Max and the Fashion Show

7+ / Developing
 Andrew Cope – Spy Dog
 Betty G. Birney – The World According to Humphrey

9+ / Confident
 Mark Walden – H.I.V.E. Higher Institute of Villainous Education
 Derek Landy – Skulduggery Pleasant

12+ / Fluent
 Sophie McKenzie – Girl, Missing
 Robert Muchamore – CHERUB: The Recruit

2011 Children’s Book Club
In 2011, Richard & Judy relaunched the Children’s Book Club in conjunction with the BookTrust charity in an effort to get children reading & help parents choose books appropriate for their child’s literacy level. 

Fluent
 Jo Nesbø -  Doctor Proctor’s Fart Powder
 Janet Foxley - Muncle Trogg
 Cathy Brett - Scarlett Dedd
 Eva Ibbotson - The Ogre of Oglefort
 Elisabeth Beresford - The Wombles
 Scott Seegert - Vordak The Incomprehensible: How to Grow Up and Rule the World
 
Read by Yourself
 Alex T. Smith - Claude in the City
 Marcus Sedgwick - The Raven Mysteries: Flood and Fang
 Dominic Barker & Hannah Shaw - Max & Molly’s Guide to Trouble: How to Catch a Criminal
 Tommy Donbavand - Scream Street: Heart of the Mummy
 Gwyneth Rees - The Magic Princess Dress
 Derek Keilty - Will Gallows & the Snake Bellied Troll
 
Reading Together
 Rex Stone - Dinosaur Cove: Attack of the Lizard King
 Francesca Simon & Tony Ross - Horrid Henry and the Football Fiend
 Annette & Nick Butterworth - Jake the Good Bad Dog
 Holly Webb - Molly’s Magic: The Witch’s Kitten
 Margaret Ryan - Roodica the Rude & The Famous Flea Trick
 Laura Owen & Korky Paul - Winnie Goes Batty

New Writers Book Club
Launched in October 2008, the club "highlights 12 debut writers over the course of a year".

2008
 Oct: Hillary Jordan – Mudbound
 Nov: Farahad Zama – The Marriage Bureau for Rich People
 Dec: Nancy Horan – Loving Frank

2009
 Jan: Jennie Rooney – Inside the Whale
 Feb: Melissa Benn – One of Us
 Mar: Tom Rob Smith – Child 44

References

External links
 The Richard and Judy Book Club, W H Smith

Lists of novels